Melfjordbotn or Melfjorden is a village in Rødøy Municipality in Nordland county, Norway. The village is located at the eastern end of the Melfjorden, southwest of the Svartisen glacier.

The village is fairly remote, with only one road leading in and out of the village, the Norwegian County Road 355, which was built in 1982.  The road is a steep mountain road with many hairpin turns that doesn't connect it to the rest of Rødøy, but instead connects it to the neighboring municipality of Rana.  The road is often closed during the winter.

References

Rødøy
Villages in Nordland
Populated places of Arctic Norway